Nepenthes rowaniae (after Ellis Rowan, Australian naturalist and illustrator) is a species of pitcher plant endemic to the Cape York Peninsula, Australia. It is closely related to N. mirabilis and was once considered an extreme form of this species.

Taxonomy

Between 1881 and 1905, Frederick Manson Bailey described 11 species of Nepenthes from northern Australia, all of which were placed in synonymy with N. mirabilis by B. H. Danser in 1928. The only taxon which Danser considered to possess morphological characters atypical of N. mirabilis was N. rowaniae. He wrote:

"Of all these I have seen the type or at least authentic specimens, but they are nearly all mere growth forms of N. mirabilis. Only N. rowanae shows a character not yet met with in N. mirabilis, viz. campanulate-infundibuliform upper pitchers. A similar aberration, however, is often met with in several allied species and is certainly insufficient for specific distinction."

However, field observations carried out between 2001 and 2003 "showed that N. rowanae possesses several stable, significant morphological and ecological characteristics that are not exhibited by N. mirabilis", and the taxon was subsequently elevated to a species in 2005. This opinion is not universally shared; taxonomist Jan Schlauer continues to treat N. rowaniae as a heterotypic synonym of N. mirabilis in his Carnivorous Plant Database.

Spelling

According to the ICBN, the correct spelling of this taxon's name is Nepenthes rowaniae, as the epithet is based on the personal name Rowan. There is only one correct way to  form this epithet (in the genitive: Rec 60C.1.b.) and the resulting correct spelling is mandatory; any usage of the spelling rowanae is to be corrected to rowaniae (Art 60.11). However, the literature tends to use Nepenthes rowanae, instead.

Natural hybrids

N. mirabilis × N. rowaniae
N. rowaniae × N. tenax

References

Further reading

 Bateman, D. 2011. Scientists combing Cape York for new carnivorous plant. The Cairns Post, April 29, 2011.
 Clarke, C.M & R. Kruger 2006. Nepenthes tenax C.Clarke and R.Kruger (Nepenthaceae), a new species from Cape York Peninsula, Queensland. Austrobaileya 7(2): 319–324.
 Grigg, S. 1995. Nepenthes mirabilis. Bulletin of the Australian Carnivorous Plant Society, Inc. 14(3): 4.
 Kruger, R. 2001. Nepenthes of Cape York (Part 1). Bulletin of the Australian Carnivorous Plant Society 20(3): 13–17.
 Kruger, R. 2001. Nepenthes of Cape York (Part 2). Bulletin of the Australian Carnivorous Plant Society 20(4): 6–9.
 Lavarack, P.S. 1981. Nepenthes mirabilis in Australia. Carnivorous Plant Newsletter 10(3): 69–72, 74–76.
 Mansell, G. 2003. Australian Nepenthes Discovery of the Century.... Exotica Plants. 
 McPherson, S.R. & A. Robinson 2012. Field Guide to the Pitcher Plants of Australia and New Guinea. Redfern Natural History Productions, Poole.
 Wilson, G.W., F. Venter, R.F. Wilson & D. Crayn 2011. Chasing Nepenthes on Cape York, Queensland. Carnivorous Plant Newsletter 40(4): 122–128.
 Nepenthes of Australia by Stewart McPherson

Carnivorous plants of Australia
rowaniae
Plants described in 1897
Caryophyllales of Australia
Flora of Queensland